Fannie Bay is an electoral division of the Legislative Assembly in Australia's Northern Territory. It is located in the inner northern suburbs of Darwin, with its current boundaries including the suburbs of Fannie Bay (from which it derives its name), Parap, East Point, The Narrows, The Gardens and parts of Stuart Park. It was first created in 1974, and is an entirely urban electorate, covering an area of 11 km². There were 5,473 people enrolled in the electorate as of August 2020.

Fannie Bay has been an exception in Northern Territory politics, as it has tended to be neither marginal or safe for either party, with incumbent members of both parties having managed to easily hold the electorate for several years. This was illustrated in 1995, when Country Liberal Party Chief Minister Marshall Perron resigned, only to be replaced by the Labor Party's Clare Martin—who six years later herself became Chief Minister while still representing the electorate. Martin resigned as Chief Minister in 2007, and retired at the 2008 election. Michael Gunner narrowly retained the seat for Labor, and went on to become Opposition Leader in 2015.  He led Territory Labor to a record victory in 2016, becoming the third person to become Chief Minister while holding Fannie Bay.

On 27 July 2022, Michael Gunner announced his resignation from politics as the Member for Fannie Bay, triggering a by-election in the seat to be held on 20 August 2022. Brent Potter won the by-election.

Members for Fannie Bay

Election results

References

External links
Division profile from the Northern Territory Electoral Commission

Fannie Bay